The Brewster SB2A Buccaneer was a single-engined mid-wing monoplane scout/bomber aircraft built by the Brewster Aeronautical Corporation for the Royal Air Force (RAF) and United States Navy between 1942 and 1944. It was also supplied to the United States Army Air Forces and United States Marine Corps. The Buccaneer was overweight and lacked maneuverability, and has been described as a "classic failure"; while designed as a scout bomber, none saw combat, although a number found use in noncombat roles.

The SB2A was developed for the US Navy, and also ordered in large quantities by the Dutch, French, and British Governments. The Dutch order was later taken over by the US Navy and the French order by Britain. An Australian order was cancelled before any of the type were delivered. The Buccaneer was underpowered and poorly constructed, and all of its operators considered it to be unsuitable for combat. SB2As were used as target tugs by the RAF and US Navy, trainers by the USMC, and "hacks" by the USAAF. Many of the completed aircraft were scrapped without entering service. The type is considered by historians to have been among the worst of World War II. The Brewster Corporation itself closed in 1946.

Design and development
In early 1939 the United States Navy's Bureau of Aeronautics launched a program to develop larger scout/bombers to operate from the Navy's aircraft carriers. In April that year the Brewster Aeronautical Corporation was selected to build a prototype of its Model 340 design to meet this requirement; this aircraft was to be designated the XSB2A-1.

The XSB2A-1's design was heavily based on the earlier Brewster SBA scout-bomber. It shared the single-engined, mid-winged monoplane layout of the earlier aircraft, but was larger and had a more powerful engine. The XSB2A-1 was powered by a single Wright R-2600 engine which drove a three-bladed propeller. It was armed with two forward-firing 0.50 inch calibre machine guns in the fuselage and two 0.30 machine guns in each wing.

The first XSB2A-1 prototype commenced flying trials on 17 June 1941. The results of this testing and changing requirements led to significant changes to the design. These included the airframe being lengthened by 1 foot and two inches, the turret being replaced by a flexible mount in the rear of the cockpit for a pair of 0.30 machine guns, the addition of armour and self-sealing fuel tanks, and changes to the design of the fins and canopy. The combined effect of these changes resulted in the aircraft's weight increasing by almost , which greatly reduced its speed, weapons load, and flying range.

The airframe was not well designed, and could be easily damaged. The SB2A was manned by a crew of two: a pilot and
airman who served as both an observer and a gunner.

Production

The French Government placed an order for 250 SB2As. Following the fall of France this order was taken over by the British Government, which subsequently ordered a further 500 during 1940; in British service the type was designated the Brewster Bermuda. The Dutch Government also ordered 162 SB2As before the German conquest of the country in May 1940. The Australian Government ordered 243 Bermudas for the Royal Australian Air Force in mid-1940. In December 1940 the US Navy placed an order for 140 SB2As.

Deliveries of the SB2A were greatly delayed. When the French Government placed its order it expected to begin receiving the type from April 1941, after Brewster completed the production of its Brewster F2A Buffalo fighters. However, Brewster experienced difficulties in completing the Buffalos and commencing work on the SB2A. After the British Government requested substantial modifications to the SB2A in early 1941, Brewster formally advised that it would be unable to start deliveries of the type as had been planned earlier. These delays led the Australian Government to cancel its order of Bermudas in October 1941 in favour of purchasing 297 Vultee Vengeances. Following the attack on Pearl Harbor, the US Government appropriated 192 of the aircraft which had been ordered by the British in January 1942; these aircraft were to be operated by the United States Army Air Forces (USAAF).

Serious problems within Brewster also contributed to delays. The company was badly run, and its workforce was poorly trained and frequently took strike action. After Brewster missed deadlines to deliver aircraft to the US Navy, it was taken over by the Navy in April 1942. Production continued to be slow, however, and many of the completed SB2As suffered from defects.

Operational history

Deliveries of Brewster Bermudas to the British Royal Air Force commenced in July 1942. The RAF judged that the type was unsuitable for combat, and most of the Bermudas delivered to the service were converted to target tugs. Five of the aircraft were transferred to the Fleet Air Arm of the Royal Navy for assessment – four as dive bombers and one as a target towing tug.

The USAAF received 108 Bermudas, which it designated the A-34. The type was considered unsuitable even for training purposes, and were used only as "hacks". As the aircraft broke down they were either abandoned or used as targets for artillery training. The A-34s were withdrawn from service in 1944.

Deliveries to the US Navy took place during 1943 and 1944. The service received 80 SB2A-2s and 60 SB2A-3s; the latter variant was fitted with folding wings and an arrester hook to enable them to operate from aircraft carriers. The US Navy also regarded the SB2A as unsuitable for combat and training purposes, and mainly used its aircraft as target tugs and for ground maintenance training.

The aircraft originally ordered by the Dutch were assigned by the US Navy to the United States Marine Corps. Designated the SB2A-4, the Marines used some of these aircraft to establish their first night fighter squadron VMF(N)-531.

Due to the poor performance of the SB2A, many of the completed aircraft were scrapped by the RAF and US Navy without having been flown operationally. The US Navy cancelled its remaining order of the type in 1943. A total of 771 SB2As were eventually completed.

The Truman Committee stated that the SB2A "turned in a miserable performance."

Historians regard the SB2A as a failure. David Donald has labelled it "one of the worst aircraft of World War II". Similarly, the Pima Air & Space Museum's website states that the type was "perhaps the least successful Allied aircraft of World War II". The National Naval Aviation Museum's website also notes that "overweight, underpowered, and lacking maneuverability, the Brewster SB2A Buccaneer was a classic failure".

Variants

XSB2A-1 Buccaneer
Prototype, one built (Bu1632, 01005).
SB2A-2
Initial production, revised armament – non-folding wings. 80 built (Bu00803/00882).
SB2A-3
Fitted with folding wings and arrestor hook for carrier operations. 60 built (Bu00883/00942).
SB2A-4
Aircraft built for Netherlands and requisitioned for the US Navy. 162 built (Bu29214/29375).
A-34 Bermuda
Designation for Lend Lease production for United Kingdom
Bermuda Mk.1
Model 340-14 production for United Kingdom. Powered gun mounting replaced by flexible gun mounting. Only 468 of 750 ordered were delivered.

Operators

 Royal Air Force
 Fleet Air Arm

 United States Army Air Corps
 United States Navy
 United States Marine Corps

Survivors

 RAF s/n FF860 – National Museum of Naval Aviation at Naval Air Station Pensacola, Florida. It is displayed as a US Navy SB2A Buccaneer.
 s/n unknown – in storage at the Pima Air and Space Museum in Tucson, Arizona.

Specifications (SB2A-4)

See also

References

Notes

References

 
 
 
 
 
 
 
 
 
 Swanborough, Gordon and Peter M. Bowers. United States Navy Aircraft since 1911. London: Putnam, Second edition 1976. .
 Andrade, John M. . U.S Military Aircraft Designations and Serials since 1909. Leicester : Midland Counties Publications, First edition 1979. .

SB02A
Brewster SB2A
World War II dive bombers of the United States
Single-engined tractor aircraft
Carrier-based aircraft
World War II ground attack aircraft of the United States
Mid-wing aircraft
Aircraft first flown in 1941